(or ) aka The Opium War  is a 1943 black-and-white Japanese film directed by Masahiro Makino.

"Ahen senso" in Japan refers to the First Opium War. The story of the film concerns this war.

Cast

References

Bibliography 
 
Washitani, Hana. "The Opium War and the cinema wars: a Hollywood in the greater East Asian co-prosperity sphere." Inter-Asia Cultural Studies 4.1 (2003). pp. 63–76.

External links 
 

Japanese black-and-white films
1943 films
Films directed by Masahiro Makino
1943 war films
Toho films
Japanese war films
Films scored by Ryōichi Hattori
First Opium War
1940s Japanese-language films